Arthur Cox (7 April 1934 – 9 April 2021) was a British character actor, who appeared in a number of roles in television and on stage during a career which spanned from the mid-1950s to 2020.

Life and career
Cox was born in Banbridge, County Down, Northern Ireland, in April 1934. He made his theatrical debut in Belfast during the mid-1950s, appearing in a production of A View from the Bridge by Arthur Miller. His first appearance on stage in Dublin was as Ordulto in the play, The Masquerade of Henry IV in 1955.

Television

In 1978 he played Sir Jasper Addleton in the Wodehouse Playhouse episode 'The Smile that Wins'.
During the 1980s, Cox's profile on television was raised after portraying Inspector Marriott in the drama Agatha Christie's Partners in Crime, as well as starring in Yes Minister as George, the driver of cabinet minister Jim Hacker.

He died on 9 April 2021, two days after turning 87.

Partial filmography

Saturday Playhouse (1958, TV Series) as Mr. Hushes
Hereward the Wake (1965) as Pery
Fahrenheit 451 (1966) as Male Nurse (uncredited)
Dixon of Dock Green (1966–1968, TV Series) as First Officer / Johnson / Hall
The Avengers (1967–1968, TV Series) as Anaesthetist / Clarke
Doctor Who (1968, TV Series) as Cully
ITV Playhouse (1968–1978, TV Series) as Sergeant / Cousin / Mr. Baker
Sweeney 2 (1978) as Detective
Yes Minister (1980–1981, TV Series) as George
Agatha Christie's Partners in Crime (1983–1984, TV Series) as Inspector Marriott
Give My Regards to Broad Street (1984) as BBC Engineer
Castaway (1986) as Inland Revenue manager (uncredited)
God's Outlaw (1986) as Peter Quentel
The Bill (1986–1993, TV Series) as Off-License Manager / Simpkins
Personal Services (1987) as Lennox
Aria (1987) as Major (segment "Un ballo in maschera")
Hope and Glory (1987) as Fireman
Little Dorrit (1987) as Stage Carpenter
The Zero Option (1988) as Sid
She-Wolf of London (1990–1991, TV Series) as Dad Matheson
Shuttlecock (1991) as Fizz / Fox
Agatha Christie's Poirot (1993, TV Series) as Dr. Hawker
Lovejoy (1993, TV Series) as Peter Stroud
Coronation Street (1994, TV Series) as Mr. Tonks
The Young Poisoner's Handbook (1995) as Ray
Girl from Rio (2001) as Bank Customer
Christmas Carol: The Movie (2001) as Dr. Lambert (voice)
To Kill a King (2003) as Westminster Abbey priest
Jane Eyre (2006, TV Mini-Series) as Colonel Dent
Doctor Who (2010, TV Series) as Mr. Henderson
Shuttlecock (2020) as Fizz

References

External links
 
 Aveleyman: Arthur Cox
 British Comedy Guide: Arthur Cox
 Arthur Cox at Theatricalia

1934 births
2021 deaths
20th-century male actors from Northern Ireland
21st-century male actors from Northern Ireland
Male television actors from Northern Ireland
People from Banbridge